Moeto carstvo ("My Kingdom") is the second and final album by Macedonian rock group Aleksandar Makedonski. It was released in 1996. Unlike their previous album, Za heroje i princeze, which was a Serbo-Croatian-language pop-rock album, Moeto carstvo is a Macedonian-language alternative rock album. This album can also be considered a Badmingtons album due to all three Badmingtons members appearing, with the addition of a rhythm guitarist and a bassist.

The album had no singles when it originally came out, however the tracks "Ako mi dadesh" and "Ubav den" were re-appropriated as Badmingtons songs and released as a single in 2007 to promote the Igor Ivanov movie Prevrteno. The versions of the songs that appear on the single are the original Moeto carstvo-era recordings, remastered. The remastered songs also appear on the private CD release Kolektorska edicija from that same year. A music video was also released for "Ako mi dadesh", set to clips from the movie.

The track "Gospode" is a cover of a song by Saraceni, a band formed by Vladimir Petrovski - Karter in 1980 with Goran Trajkovski and Shpend Ibrahim.

Track listing

Personnel 
 Vladimir Petrovski – vocals, lead guitar
 Aleksandar Krstevski – rhythm guitar, backing vocals
 Zoran Jankovic – bass
 Boris Georgiev – drums
 Dejan Shkartov – keyboards

External links 
 Moeto carstvo at Discogs

1996 albums
Aleksandar Makedonski albums